Progar Airstrip ( / Aerodrom Progar) is an aerodrome in Serbia mostly used for agricultural purposes. The grass runway is located near the village of Progar, near the town Surčin, about 42 km southwest from the Belgrade city centre.

Airports in Serbia
Surčin